Großnondorf is the name of the following places:

 a cadastral community in the municipal Guntersdorf, Lower Austria, Austria
 a cadastral community in the municipal Sallingberg, Lower Austria, Austria